Derek McCormack, BSc, PgDip, MSc (Otago) DipTchg, is Vice-Chancellor of the Auckland University of Technology (AUT), New Zealand. As such he is the executive head of the newest of the eight New Zealand universities.

He began his academic career as a biochemist, in the Otago Polytechnic. He later became the National President of the Association of Staff in Tertiary Education (ASTE). McCormack joined AUT as Associate Director Academic. From there he held a series of administrative posts, as Corporate Services Director, General Manager, and finally Deputy Vice-Chancellor Administration. McCormack succeeded the previous Vice-Chancellor, the Rev'd Dr John Hinchcliff in 2004. In July 2006 his term of office was extended for another five years.

References 

Academic staff of the Auckland University of Technology
Living people
Year of birth missing (living people)
University of Otago alumni
Heads of universities and colleges in New Zealand